Phillip Hunter Prince (August 4, 1926 – February 28, 2020) was a President of Clemson University and a student-athlete for the Clemson Tigers football team. He received the Clemson Distinguished Athletes Award in 2015.

Prince was born in Bostic, North Carolina in 1926 and was schooled in Erwin, Tennessee before receiving, in 1944, an athletics scholarship to Clemson College. His education was interrupted by serving in the US Army from 1944 to 1945 but on resuming his studies, he became joint captain of the 1948 Football Team which won the 1949 Gator Bowl and later became Vice President of the 1949 Senior Class. He graduated to Columbia University and rejoined the army from 1950 to 1951.

Prince was a letterman for four years in the Clemson football team in the years 1944 and 1946–48. In his true freshman season, Prince started at left tackle on the Tigers' offensive line. Prince had to pause his activities at Clemson due to his service in the United States Army from 1944 to 1945. He served as co-captain of the 1948 team that finished with an 11–0 record and #11 ranking in the final Associated Press poll. After graduation, he worked for Milliken & Company between 1951 and 1967.

In February 1994, he became acting president of Clemson University and served 11 months, until he was named president by the board on September 30, 1994. During his tenure, he instigated wide-ranging changes including reducing the number of colleges from nine to four (this was later to become five), an organizational structure that endured for the next two decades. He was recognised for his long-term commitment to the college by the receipt of an honorary Doctor of Humanities degree in May 1995. He died at the age of 93 on February 28, 2020.

References

1926 births
2020 deaths
American football offensive linemen
Clemson Tigers football players
Presidents of Clemson University
People from Rutherford County, North Carolina
Military personnel from North Carolina
Players of American football from North Carolina
Columbia University alumni
United States Army personnel of World War II